This is a comprehensive list of all the lines operated by the Catalan government-owned Ferrocarrils de la Generalitat de Catalunya rail company, ordered by type.

Suburban lines
The FGC suburban lines is the collective name given to the suburban metro network that serves the Barcelona metropolitan area and is fare-integrated with most of the other ATM transport services in the city. They're operated by Ferrocarrils de la Generalitat de Catalunya and sometimes are considered part of Rodalies Barcelona.
These are all S-prefixed (after suburbà):
S1 - Barcelona-Pl. Catalunya - Terrassa
S2 - Barcelona-Pl. Catalunya - Sabadell Parc del Nord
S3 - Barcelona-Pl. Espanya - Can Ros
S4 - Barcelona-Pl. Espanya - Olesa de Montserrat
S5 and S7 - Barcelona-Pl. Catalunya - Sant Cugat - Rubí
S6 - Barcelona-Pl. Catalunya - Universitat Autònoma de Barcelona
S8 - Barcelona-Pl. Espanya - Martorell

Rodalies lines
Part of the cercanías commuter train system in R-prefixed (after rodalies) just like the rest of Rodalies Barcelona lines:
R5 and R50 - Barcelona-Pl. Espanya - Manresa
R6 and R60 - Barcelona-Pl. Espanya - Igualada

Barcelona Metro lines

These are L-prefixed, just like any other metro line in Barcelona:
L6 - Plaça de Catalunya - Sarrià 
L7 - Plaça de Catalunya - Av. Tibidabo
L8 - Plaça d'Espanya - Molí Nou-Ciutat Cooperativa
L12 - Sarrià - Reina Elisenda

Lleida-Balaguer-La Pobla de Segur line
Lleida - La Pobla de Segur line.

Bus services
Can Sant Joan - Polígon Can Sant Joan
Piera - Els Hostalets de Pierola
Piera - Urbanitzacions de Piera
Capellades - Capellades Estació
Corbera bus service
Martorell bus service
Pallejà-Fontpineda bus service

Funiculars
Funicular de Vallvidrera
Funicular de Gelida

Other services
Cremallera de Montserrat
Cremallera de Núria
Ferrocarril Turístic de l'Alt Llobregat (La Pobla de Lillet - Castellar de n'Hug)
Ski station in La Molina

Upcoming lines
Sabadell Metro
Terrassa Metro

See also
Metro del Baix Llobregat - Llobregat–Anoia line
Metro del Vallès - Línia Barcelona-Vallès

Ferrocarrils de la Generalitat de Catalunya lines
Rail transport in Barcelona
Ferrocarrils de la Generalitat de Catalunya
Rail transport in Catalonia